Seonna Hong (born 1973) is a contemporary Los Angeles-based artist who works in fine art and animation. Her paintings have appeared in exhibitions in Los Angeles, New York City, and Tokyo, Japan.

Early life and education
Born and raised in Southern California, Hong is the daughter of parents who immigrated from Korea. Her father was an architect. As a child, Hong enjoyed drawing cartoon characters like Hello Kitty and Strawberry Shortcake. She graduated from California State University, Long Beach, with a degree in general art. After graduation, she worked as a teacher.

Career

Animation 
Her work as a background painter has appeared in animated series and films, most notably in the Nickelodeon series, My Life as a Teenage Robot, for which she received an Emmy Award in 2003. She worked on The Mighty B! as an art director and background painter from 2008 to 2011.

Fine art 
Hong's inspirations include "the abstract paintings of Helen Frankenthaler, Sonia Delaunay’s vivid use of colors and patterns, and Jackson Pollack’s drip and expressive techniques." She is known for her surreal landscape paintings, which often include small human and animal figures. Her work has frequently been featured in art magazine Juxtapoz.

In 2004 h er first solo show took place in New York at the Oliver Kamm/5BE Gallery, where she exhibited illustrations for her future children's book, Animus. She received the Joan Mitchell Foundation grant in 2006. In 2008, Japanese artist Takashi Murakami picked her as the first American artist to have a solo show at the KaiKai Kiki gallery in Japan. She has since had solo shows at LaBasse Projects in Culver City, Jonathan Levine Gallery in New York, and three at Hashimoto Contemporary in San Francisco.

In 2020, actress Lily Collins mentioned she collects Hong's artwork.

External links

References 

American women painters
Living people
Painters from California
21st-century American women artists
1973 births
California State University, Long Beach alumni
American artists of Korean descent
21st-century American painters